Paralipomena (Greek neuter past participle plural; "things omitted") may refer to:

 Paralipomenon, a Greek name for the Old Testament Books of Chronicles
 Paralipomena of Jeremiah (4 Baruch), pseudepigraphicon attributed to the prophet Baruch
 Rest of the Words of Baruch, a version of 4 Baruch included in the Ethiopic version of Säqoqawä Eremyas (Lamentations)
 Paralipomena Orphica, 1970 essay by Harry Mulisch
 Parerga and Paralipomena (or Accessories and Postscripts), 1851 work by philosopher Arthur Schopenhauer
 Paralipomeni della Batracomiomachia, 1835 satirical sequel by Giacomo Leopardi to Homer's Batrachomyomachia (Battle of Frogs and Mice)
 Paralipomena: Remains of Gospels and Sayings of Christ, Rev. Bernhard Pick 1908. Pick uses the word in the title but not in the text, to refer to extra-canonical sayings of Jesus.
 Paralipomena, the final chapter in Theodor Adorno's Aesthetic Theory

See also
Paraliomera, a genus of crab

Christian terminology